Fatos Omari (unknown – unknown) was an Albanian chess player, Albanian Chess Championship winner (1968).

Biography
From the begin to 1960s to the mid-1970s Fatos Omari was one of Albania's leading chess players. In 1968, he won Albanian Chess Championship.

Fatos Omari played for Albania in the Chess Olympiads:
 In 1960, at first reserve board in the 14th Chess Olympiad in Leipzig (+6, =3, -4),
 In 1962, at second reserve board in the 15th Chess Olympiad in Varna (+3, =5, -3),
 In 1970, at first reserve board in the 19th Chess Olympiad in Siegen (+2, =5, -1),
 In 1972, at first reserve board in the 20th Chess Olympiad in Skopje (+1, =0, -0).

Fatos Omari played for Albania in the World Student Team Chess Championships:
 In 1958, at third board in the 5th World Student Team Chess Championship in Varna (+1, =3, -6).

In 2001, Fatos Omari participated in 1st European Senior Chess Championship.

References

External links

Fatos Omari chess games at 365chess.com

Year of birth missing
Year of death missing
Albanian chess players
Chess Olympiad competitors
20th-century chess players